The 1994 Canadian National Soccer League season was the seventy-second season for the Canadian National Soccer League. The season began on May 28, 1994, with Montreal Ramblers facing Toronto Croatia at the Complexe sportif Claude-Robillard. The majority of the season was contested by the reigning champions, St. Catharines Roma, along with Montreal Croatia, and Toronto Italia. The title was eventually won by Toronto Italia after defeating St. Catharines in the CNSL Championship final. Toronto would also secure the double, which included the regular-season title. St. Catharines Roma won the league cup.

The league lost its presence in Manitoba and was restricted in Ontario and Quebec. The league continued to operate as the only exclusively Canadian professional league within the country while the Canadian clubs in the American Professional Soccer League served as the highest tier league in the country's soccer structure.

Overview  
The season saw a reduction in league membership as the boundaries of the league were restricted to Ontario and Quebec. The CNSL lost its presence in Manitoba as the Winnipeg Fury ceased operations due to heavy financial losses. While the Eastern Division of Quebec was disbanded with only Montreal Croatia, and Montreal Ramblers operating in the province. Richmond Hill Kick was suspended midway through the 1993 season after several missed scheduled matches and failure in payment fees. Toronto Rockets were awarded a franchise in the American Professional Soccer League to replace the Toronto Blizzard. 

After a dispute over philosophical differences with league commissioner Rocco Lofranco, the Windsor Wheels joined the United States Interregional Soccer League and relocated to Detroit, Michigan. Another notable departure occurred near the conclusion of the season as Toronto Croatia withdrew after a dispute with the front office and the following season joined the Canadian International Soccer League (Puma League). While at the live gate the league struggled in drawing consistent crowds, which according to Lofranco the 1994 FIFA World Cup played a factor in lowering the attendance numbers.

Teams

Final standings

Playoffs

Quarterfinals

Semifinals

Final

Cup  
The cup tournament was a separate contest from the rest of the season, in which all eight teams took part. All the matches were separate from the regular season, and the teams were grouped into two separate divisions. The two winners in the group stage would advance to a singles match for the Cup. Originally Toronto Croatia participated in the cup competition, but near the conclusion of the season withdrew from both the regular season and cup tournament.

Group A

Group B

Final

Individual awards  
The 1994 CNSL annual awards only presented four awards with Toronto Italia receiving the majority of the accolades. The Golden Boot and Rookie of the Year were given to Italia forward Ryan Gamble, who would later go onto higher endeavors in the USISL D-3 Pro League, and USISL A-League. Peter Pinizzotto was named the Coach of the Year after achieving a treble with Italia. He would ultimately spend time with the Toronto Lynx, and Montreal Impact. The final receipt was Scarborough Astros Brazilian import Paulo Silva, with his third Goalkeeper of the Year award. Silva would later serve as the goalkeeping coach for the Toronto Lynx under Pinizzotto.

References

External links
RSSSF CNSL page
thecnsl.com - 1994 season

1994–95 domestic association football leagues
Canadian National Soccer League
1994